Uhligella is an extinct cephalopod genus from the Early Cretaceous (Late Aptian to Early Albian), belonging to the ammonoid subclass and included in the Desmoceratidae.

Uhligella is described as being high-whorled with a broadly or narrowly rounded venter, in which the early whorls have strong or weak sinuous ribs but the outer whorls are smooth.

Uhligella may have given rise to Beudanticeras and is preceded by another related genus, Zurcherella.

Distribution 
Fossils of Uhligella have been found in Argentina, Colombia (Hiló Formation, Tolima and in La Guajira), France, Madagascar, Mexico, Morocco, the United Kingdom, the United States (Arkansas), and  Venezuela.

References

Further reading 
 Arkell et al., 1957. Mesozoic Ammonoidea; Treatise on Invertebrate Paleontology, Part L (Ammonoidea). Geol Soc of America and Univ Kansas Press.

Desmoceratidae
Early Cretaceous ammonites
Ammonites of Africa
Cretaceous Africa
Ammonites of Europe
Cretaceous Europe
Ammonites of North America
Cretaceous United States
Cretaceous Mexico
Ammonites of South America
Cretaceous Argentina
Cretaceous Colombia
Cretaceous Venezuela
Aptian life
Albian life
Fossil taxa described in 1907
Albian genus extinctions
Ammonitida genera